The brown-capped whitestart or brown-capped redstart (Myioborus brunniceps) is a species of bird in the family Parulidae.
It is found in humid Andean forests and woodlands in Bolivia and north-western Argentina. It sometimes includes the tepui whitestart as a subspecies.

References

brown-capped whitestart
Birds of the Yungas
Birds of Argentina
brown-capped whitestart
Taxonomy articles created by Polbot